David S. Allee (born 1969) is an American artist and photographer.

Education
Allee received an undergraduate degree in economics and government from Cornell University in 1991, and his MFA in photography from the School of Visual Arts (2001). He began his career as an urban planner before switching to photography.

Photography
Allee's photographs are focused on the built environment, and on architecture in particular. He is well known for using found available light at night in his work, beginning with White Nights (2000–03) and followed by Cross Lands and, most recently, Chasing Firefly. He has also exhibited and published series of images of the abandoned Harlem Valley Psychiatric Center (2006–10) and the defunct Domino Sugar Refinery in Brooklyn (2013–14). In 2020, he used a tilt-shift lens to control perspective while taking frontal photographs of Broadway theatres closed due to the coronavirus pandemic.

Exhibitions

Solo exhibitions
David S. Allee, Knoxville Museum of Art, 2004
Dark Day, Morgan Lehman Gallery, New York City, 2011
Frame of View, Morgan Lehman Gallery, New York City, 2013

Group exhibitions
Selections from the Bronx Museum Permanent Collection, Bronx Museum of the Arts, New York, 2014
Behind the Wheel, Santa Barbara Museum of Art, Santa Barbara, CA, 2012

Collections
Bronx Museum of the Arts
Santa Barbara Museum of Art
Knoxville Museum of Art

References

External links
 Artist's website
 Eye of Photography, David S. Allee Chasing Firefly
 GQ, The Photograph's of David S. Allee

1969 births
American photographers
Living people
Cornell University alumni
School of Visual Arts alumni
Friends Seminary alumni